The Admirable Campaign was a military action led by Simón Bolívar in which the provinces of Mérida, Barinas, Trujillo and Caracas were conquered by the Patriots. Its objective was to free Venezuela from Spanish control, which was accomplished in conjunction with Santiago Mariño's simultaneous campaign in the east.

Overview
After the loss of the First Republic of Venezuela, Bolívar had gone to New Granada where he joined the army of the United Provinces, which was in the process of fighting with cities that did not recognize its authority. On January 28, 1813 Bolívar captured Ocaña, a city which was on the main roads to Venezuela. The expedition was formed by two divisions, a vanguard led by Colonel Atanasio Girardot and a rear under Colonel José Félix Ribas. At the same time Domingo de Monteverde was moving troops to western Venezuela in preparation for an invasion of New Granada, threatening the newly independent states there.

From Ocaña Bolívar moved against royalist areas of New Granada, taking the border city of Cúcuta in the Battle of Cúcuta on February 28. Here  Bolivar asked United Provinces for aid and permission to enter Venezuela through a document named the "Cartagena Manifesto". The United Provinces regarded his petition favourably taking into consideration the numerous actions that he executed for the Neogranadan government. As soon as government authorization was given, the campaign started its march into Venezuela on February 16. The expedition marched through  San Cristóbal, La Grita, Mérida and Trujillo. It is from this city that Bolívar issued his "Decree of War to the Death." In the Decree Bolivar announced that the patriot army will treat Spaniards and Criollos differently: "Spaniards and Canarians, you can expect death, even if uninvolved, if you do not actively work in favor of the independence of America. Americans, count on life, even if guilty." The Decree would remain in force, technically, until the treaty signed with Pablo Morillo at Santa Ana de Trujillo on November 26, 1820, regularized the rules of engagement.

The last major engagement of the campaign was the Battle of Los Horcones on July 22. After that the expedition occupied the cities of Valencia and La Victoria in early August. Losing on two fronts, the royalist government surrendered on August 4. Bolívar's forces had a triumphal entrance into the city of Caracas on August 6, bringing an end to the campaign and reestablishing the Venezuelan republic.

See also

 Nevado, the mucuchies puppy gift to Simon Bolivar, from the Admirable Campaign.
 Military career of Simón Bolívar

References

External links 
 Simón-Bolívar.org - Admirable Campaign (1813) 
 Venezuela Tuya - Admirable Campaign (1813) 

Campaigns of the Venezuelan War of Independence
Simón Bolívar
1813 in Venezuela
1813 in the Viceroyalty of New Granada
June 1813 events